The 2014–15 Moldovan National Division is the 24th season of top-tier football in Moldova. The competition began in July 2014 and ended in May 2015.

Teams

Stadia and locations

Personnel and sponsorship

Managerial changes

League table

Positions by round
The following table represents the teams position after each round in the competition.

Results
The schedule consists of three rounds. During the first two rounds, each team plays each other once home and away for a total of 20 matches. The pairings of the third round will then be set according to the standings after the first two rounds, giving every team a third game against each opponent for a total of 30 games per team.

First and second round

Third round
Key numbers for pairing determination (number marks position after 36 games):

Top goalscorers
Updated to matches played on 21 May 2015.

Hat-tricks

Clean sheets

Disciplinary

Fair-Play Award

Points are allocated points to each yellow (1 point), two yellow (2 points) and red card (3 points) for ranking purposes. This does not represent any official rankings.

Attendance

References

External links
 Official website

1
Moldovan Super Liga seasons
Moldova 1